Sebastião Barroso Lazaroni, (born 25 September 1950) is a Brazilian football manager who last coached Qatar Stars League club Qatar SC. He was born in Muriaé, Minas Gerais state.

He is well known in Brazil as the manager who tried to introduce the libero position in Brazilian football. He used the 3–5–2 scheme during the 1990 FIFA World Cup, but it was a failure, and Brazil was eliminated in the second round by Argentina.

When he was the Brazil national team head coach, in 35 matches, he won 21, drew seven and lost seven.

He helped Brazil win the South American Championship in 1989, the team's first Copa América title in 39 years.

He is also known for his being the head coach of Turkish club Fenerbahçe that ended the 40-year undefeated European home record of Manchester United in the UEFA Champions' League match in 1996.

He took over the Qatar national team on 1 August 2011 as a replacement for Milovan Rajevac, but was ultimately fired four months later as a result of the team's unimpressive performances. The QFA highlighted his failure to advance past the group stage of the 2011 Pan Arab Games, which Qatar had hosted, as a main cause of his sacking. His record with the team ended with two wins, five draws and two losses. He was officially sacked on January 3, 2012 after his contract was released by QFA.

Lazaroni was last in charge of Qatar SC for the third time in his career following spells with the Doha based club between 2008–2011 and 2012–2014. His third spell ended in disappointment and he was dismissed in May 2016 after the club's relegation from Qatar Stars League.

Managerial statistics

Honours

Club
Flamengo
Campeonato Carioca: 1986

Vasco da Gama
Campeonato Carioca: 1987, 1988

Al-Hilal
Saudi Crown Prince Cup: 1995

Yokohama Marinos
J.League Cup: 2002

Qatar SC
Qatar Crown Prince Cup: 2009
Qatari Stars Cup: 2014
 
Shanghai Shenhua
FA Super Cup: 1999

International
Brazil
Copa América: 1989

Individual
South American Coach of the Year: 1989
Qatar Coach of the Year: 2009

References

External links

1950 births
Living people
Brazilian football managers
Expatriate football managers in Italy
Brazilian expatriate sportspeople in Turkey
Expatriate football managers in Turkey
Brazilian expatriate sportspeople in Kuwait
Expatriate football managers in Kuwait
Expatriate football managers in Qatar
Expatriate football managers in Mexico
Expatriate football managers in China
Brazilian expatriate football managers
Brazilian expatriate sportspeople in Japan
Brazilian people of Italian descent
Expatriate football managers in Japan
Yokohama F. Marinos managers
Expatriate football managers in Portugal
Campeonato Brasileiro Série A managers
Serie A managers
Primeira Liga managers
J1 League managers
1989 Copa América managers
1990 FIFA World Cup managers
CR Flamengo managers
CR Vasco da Gama managers
Al-Ahli Saudi FC managers
Grêmio Foot-Ball Porto Alegrense managers
Paraná Clube managers
Brazil national football team managers
ACF Fiorentina managers
Al Hilal SFC managers
S.S.C. Bari managers
Club León managers
Fenerbahçe football managers
Shanghai Shenhua F.C. managers
Jamaica national football team managers
Botafogo de Futebol e Regatas managers
Al-Arabi SC (Kuwait) managers
Esporte Clube Juventude managers
Trabzonspor managers
C.S. Marítimo managers
Qatar SC managers
Qatar national football team managers
Sportspeople from Minas Gerais
Kuwait Premier League managers
Expatriate football managers in Saudi Arabia
Brazilian expatriate sportspeople in Saudi Arabia
Saudi Professional League managers